The Battle of El Número, was a major battle during the years after the Dominican War of Independence and was fought on the 17 April 1849, nearby Azua de Compostela, Azua Province. A force of 300 Dominican troops, a portion of the Army of the South, led by General Francisco Domínguez and General Antonio Duvergé encountered an outnumbering force of 10,000 troops of the Haitian Army led by General Jean Francois Jeannot.

Campaign of 1849
Faustin Soulouque, who now governed Haiti, launched a new invasion with an army of some 10,000 men. On the 21 March 1849, Haitian soldiers attacked the Dominican garrison at Las Matas. The demoralized defenders offered almost no resistance before abandoning their weapons. Soulouque pressed on, capturing San Juan. This left only the town of Azua as the remaining Dominican stronghold between the Haitian army and the capital. Since a Dominican flotilla dominated the coastal road with its guns, Soulouque was forced to use the longer approach through El Número and Las Carreras to reach Azua and could not be supplied or reinforced from the sea.

These circumstances forced the president of the Dominican Republic, Manuel Jimenes, to call upon Pedro Santana, whom he had ousted as president, on the 2 April to restore the confidence of the army and to lead the Dominicans against this new invasion. Santana hurried from El Seibo at the head of his mounted following, some 200 men. On the 6 April, Azua fell to 18,000 Haitians and a 5,000-man Dominican counterattack failed. Santana's force swelled to some 800 men as he advanced westward. On the 17 April General Francisco Domínguez defeated an element of the Haitian army at El Número, but, lacking supplies and drinking water, he ordered a retreat to Las Carreras. Beginning on the 21 April, Santana delivered the coup de grâce to the Haitian army personally commanded by Soulouque at the two-day Battle of Las Carreras.

Soulouque had homes and mills burned as he retreated from Azua. In retaliation, a Dominican squadron composed of the brigantine 27 de Febrero (guns unknown), commanded by Capt. Charles J. Fagalde, a Frenchman, and schooner Constitución (guns unknown), commanded by Juan Luis Duquela, raided the Haitian coasts, plundered seaside villages, as far as Cape Dame Marie, and butchered crews of captured enemy ships. Fagalde left the southern coast of Haiti aflame.

References

Bibliography
 
 

Conflicts in 1849
El Numero
El Número
1849 in the Dominican Republic
April 1849 events
El Número